The 2012–13 Gibraltar Premier Division was the 114th season of the national football league in Gibraltar since its establishment - the highest level of football in Gibraltar. It was contested by six clubs - all of which are amateur. The season began on 15 September 2012 and ended on 29 May 2013. Lincoln were the defending champions, and successfully defended their title.

No team was relegated because of an expansion to eight teams next season. Gibraltar's new UEFA membership required the top division of a country to have at least seven participating clubs.

Participating teams
After the 2011–12 season the SJ Athletic Corinthians were relegated and Lynx were promoted from Division 2.
 Glacis United
 Lincoln
 Lions Gibraltar
 Lynx
 St Joseph's
 Manchester United

League table

Results 
Each team played every other team three times, either twice at home and once away, or once at home and twice away, for a total of 15 matches.

Matches 1–5

Matches 6–10

Matches 11–15

References

External links
Season at RSSSF

Gibraltar Premier Division seasons
Gib
1